Samuel L. Manzello is a technical advisor at Reax Engineering. He has worked on microgravity droplet combustion, droplet-surface interaction, soot formation in well-stirred reactor/plug flow reactor, fire-structure interaction, and structure vulnerabilities in wildland-urban interface (WUI) fires.

Life and career. 
Manzello holds B.S. with honors (1996) and PhD (2000) in mechanical engineering from University of Illinois-Chicago. He was awarded NASA Graduate Student Research fellowship during his PhD and has performed experiments in NASA's drop tower and Japan Microgravity Centre (JAMIC)’s drop tower as well as NASA's vomit comet (reduced-gravity aircraft) investigating sooting and radiation on droplet combustion in microgravity. His dissertation was “Microgravity droplet combustion: An experimental investigation on the influence of sooting and radiation on droplet burning” supervised by Prof. Mun Y. Choi.

After graduation, Manzello joined NIST as a National Research Council (NRC) postdoc fellow in 2001. During this time, he studied the droplet-surface interaction, focusing on collision dynamics. He investigated the difference of collision dynamics of pure water and pure water with sodium acetate trihydrate on hot stainless-steel surface, which was featured in journal Nature. He continued to work for NIST as a mechanical engineer after the 2-year NRC fellowship. He investigated the soot formation in well-stirred reactor/plug flow reactor, imaging soot structures by transmission electron microscopy (TEM). He also investigated structure (building) performance under fire.

Recently, Manzello has worked actively in the area of WUI fires. Manzello invented the firebrand generator, called the NIST Dragon in 2006. His work with the Dragon revealed the vulnerabilities of structures exposed to firebrand (or ember) showers in WUI fires scientifically for the first time and understanding the physical mechanism of firebrand showers significantly. In 2014, he was invited to give a plenary lecture on this topic in 11th IAFSS conference, which is considered the most prestigious conference for fire safety science. His work on WUI fires is not limited to investigation on the vulnerabilities of structures with the NIST Dragon. One of his work was featured in journal Science. He has investigated the mechanism of firebrand generation from trees as well as structures to understand firebrand process in large outdoor fires. His experimental work contributed to wildfire/WUI fires codes and standards. He was also awarded JSPS fellowship to study structure ignition by firebrands. Manzello is an Editor-in-Chief of Encyclopedia of wildfires and WUI fires, the very first reference work on this topic. Most recently, in 2021, Manzello was an invited speaker and panelist at The Chemistry of Urban Wildfires - A Virtual Information-Gathering Workshop hosted by NAE.

Manzello resigned from NIST in 2021, and joined Reax Engineering, Inc, as a technical advisor.

Awards and honors 

 NASA fellowship
 NRC fellowship
 JSPS fellowship
 2012 Department of Commerce Bronze medal (individual)
 2015 Harry C. Biggelstone Award from NFPA for a paper "Characterizing Firebrand Exposure from Wildland-Urban Interface (WUI) Fires: Results from the 2007 Angora Fire"  This is the very first journal paper which investigated the firebrand exposure from WUI fires.
 2016 Tibor Z. Harmathy Award from Springer Nature for a paper, "Experimental Study of Firebrand Transport"
 2016 Best Journal Paper Award from the Combustion Society of Japan for a paper "The Size and Mass Distribution of Firebrands collected from Ignited Building Components Exposed to Wind"
 2017 Samuel Wasley Stratton Award, NIST  "for his groundbreaking engineering and scientific research on the vulnerabilities of built structures to ignition from wind-driven firebrand showers produced from wildland-urban interface fires".
2020 Best Best Journal Paper Award from the Combustion Society of Japan for a paper "Role of firebrand combustion in large outdoor fire spread".

Selected publications 
Manzello has authored more than 80 peer-reviewed journal papers. 
 Editor-in-Chief, "Encyclopedia of wildfires and Wildland Urban Interface (WUI) fires", 2020
 "Garnering understanding into complex firebrand generation processes from large outdoor fires using simplistic laboratory-scale experimental methodologies", Fuel, 267, 117154, 2020.
 "Role of firebrand combustion in large outdoor fire spread", Progress in Energy and Combustion Science, 76, 100801, 2020.
 "Experiments to Provide the Scientific-Basis for Laboratory Standard Test Methods for Firebrand Exposure", Fire Safety Journal, 91:784-790, 2017.
 "Furnace Testing of Full-Scale Gypsum Steel Stud Non-Load Bearing Wall Assemblies: Results of Multi-Laboratory Testing in Canada, Japan, and USA". Fire Technol 46, 183, 2010
 "On the Development and Characterization  of a Firebrand Generator, Fire Safety Journal, 43: 258-268, 2008.
 "Firebrand Generation from Burning  Vegetation", Int’l J. Wildland Fire, 16: 458-462, 2007.
 "On the Collision Dynamics of a Water Droplet Containing an Additive on a Heated Solid Surface", Proceedings of the Royal Society of London A 458:2417-2444, 2002.
 "Sooting Behavior of Large Droplets in the JAMIC Facility", Proceedings of the Combustion Institute 28:1079-1086, 2000.

References

External links 
 https://www.nist.gov/people/samuel-manzello

Year of birth missing (living people)
Living people
21st-century American engineers
American mechanical engineers
University of Illinois Chicago alumni
National Institute of Standards and Technology people